Natacha Atlas, la rose pop du Caire is a 2007 documentary film.

Synopsis 
Starting out at a concert at Saint Nazaire, passing through London and finally arriving in Cairo's uproar, the film depicts a series of fragmented musical sketches that, together, form the portrait of the singer from the sands, Natacha Atlas. From one migration to the next, one sole journey, one sole melancholic dream from East to West following in the footsteps of a rose of Pop...

External links 

2007 films
Egyptian documentary films
French documentary films
2007 documentary films
Documentary films about singers
Documentary films about African music
Documentary films about women in music
2000s French films